Omar Nabil Krayem (born October 12, 1988) is an American-Palestinian professional basketball player. Standing at 183 cm (6 ft), Krayem plays as point guard.  In the 2015–16 season, Krayem led the FIBA Europe Cup in scoring with 20.4 PPG and he was second in assist at 6.6 per contest while leading Borås Basket to the second stage of the FEC.

References

External links
California Baptist bio

1988 births
Living people
American expatriate basketball people in Finland
American expatriate basketball people in France
American expatriate basketball people in Hungary
American expatriate basketball people in Mexico
American expatriate basketball people in the Philippines
American expatriate basketball people in Slovakia
American expatriate basketball people in Sweden
American men's basketball players
Basketball players from California
BC Körmend players
BC Prievidza players
Borås Basket players
California Baptist Lancers men's basketball players
Eastern Washington Eagles men's basketball players
NorthPort Batang Pier players
Palestinian men's basketball players
Philippine Basketball Association imports
Point guards
Sportspeople from Modesto, California
STB Le Havre players
Stockholm Eagles players
Palestinian expatriate basketball people in the Philippines
Leñadores de Durango players